Adrian Steirn is a photographer and filmmaker. He is the founder of Ginkgo Agency, which specialises in creating strategic high quality short form content. Steirn is also the creator of Beautiful News and 21 Icons.

Books 
21 Icons ‘Together We Are Better’

Television Series 
21 Icons Season I ‘Journey to Democracy’
21 Icons Season II ‘Promise of Freedom’
21 Icons Season III ‘Future of a Nation’

Documentaries 
 21 Icons Season I ‘Journey to Democracy’
21 Icons Season II ‘The Promise of Freedom’
 Lily Cole's Amazon Adventure
 The World's Most Wanted Leopard

Exhibitions 
This Wild Afrique
21 Icons Portrait of a Nation

References

External links
Official site

Living people
Australian photographers
Year of birth missing (living people)